Samuel W. Backus served in the California legislature and during the American Civil War he served in the US Army. From January 9, 1880 – July 1, 1882 he served as Adjutant General of the California National Guard.

Backus was born in 1844 in Poughkeepsie, New York, and moved to California in 1852, where he was educated at the public schools of Sacramento. He served in the Civil War, joining the Army of the Potomac in 1862. He was made a Second Lieutenant at 19, and served with distinction until the close of the War. He served in the Modoc wars of 1865–1866, and for a time commanded at Fort Bidwell. Retiring from the Army he entered the civil service, first in the Internal Revenue Department, and afterward in the Custom House, in 1867 he gave up the public service for private business, and became a commission merchant, and for ten years did an extensive trade. In 1878, he was elected to the State Legislature from the same district with the late Hon. John F. Swift. He was appointed Adjutant-General by Governor George C. Perkins in 1880, and was a most efficient officer, reorganizing the State militia thoroughly. He was San Francisco's Postmaster, under President's Arthur's administration ('82-86), and made such an enviable record as an administrator of public affairs that President Harrison re-appointed him in 1890.

In 1889 he purchased the San Francisco Wasp, an illustrated weekly magazine of news and satire. He also served as U.S. Immigration Commissioner in San Francisco, appointed by President Taft in 1911 and reappointed by Governor Hiram Johnson in 1913, serving until 1915.

References

External links

1844 births
Union Army officers
Members of the California State Legislature
19th-century American politicians
Year of death missing
Politicians from Poughkeepsie, New York